Tall-e Salar (also Romanized as Tall-e Sālār) is a village in Shurab Rural District, Veysian District, Dowreh County, Lorestan Province, Iran. At the 2006 census, its population was 244, in 53 families.

References 

Towns and villages in Dowreh County